Dalian People's Culture Club is a concert hall located on Zhongshan Square in Dalian, Liaoning Province, China.  Built in the European style in 1951, while the Russian troops were still stationed in Lushun and Dalian, it is one of the premium concert halls in Dalian.

History
Dalian People's Culture Club has the following history: 

1951 - Construction was started under the design of the Soviet team, led by a White Russian, while the Russian troops were still stationed in Lushun and Dalian.
1952 - Building construction was completed.   It was given the name of  the Dalian People's Culture Club by Guo Moruo
1953 - Zhou Enlai, Liu Shaoqi, Soong Ching-ling and other members of Central Committee of the Communist Party of China came to Dalian and had a national level festival, inviting many Chinese and foreign guest.
1995 - First renovation
2008 - Second renovation

Features of the Hall
There are 600 seats on the first floor and 400 seats on the second floor, a total of 1,000 seats.  The building is located at:
8 Zhongshan Square, Zhongshan District, Dalian, China

Concert halls in Dalian
There are the following concert halls in Dalian:
Dalian Development Area Grand Theatre 
Dalian People's Culture Club
Grand Hall of Dalian TV Station
Auditorium of Dalian University of Technology
Auditorium of Dalian Maritime University
Auditorium of Dalian City Young Pioneers' Palace
Auditorium of Dalian City No. 44 Middle School

Anecdotes
 Dalian City's political leaders, such as the Mayor and the Party secretary, often come to the performances of the important foreign performers, in which case the last piece of music of the encore playing is usually "Radetzky March".  It is a custom here for the leaders to exit first, while the audience clap their hands at the tune of the march.

See also
Dalian
Concert halls
Theater
Modern Buildings on Zhongshan Square in Dalian

References

External links
 Dalian People's Culture Club

Concert halls in China
Buildings and structures in Dalian
Music venues completed in 1951
1951 establishments in China